George Henry Bateman (born 1865 – 1953) was an English footballer who played for Burslem Port Vale, Stoke, and Northwich Victoria in the 1880s and 1890s.

Career
Bateman was a key member of Burslem Port Vale, helping men such as Enoch Hood found the club. He was a member of the club's first recorded line-up on 9 December 1882, in a 5–1 defeat at Stoke. He was a member of the sides that lifted the North Staffordshire Charity Challenge Cup in 1883 and Burslem Challenge Cup in 1885 and also shared the former trophy in 1885.

In the summer of 1886 he left for neighbours Stoke, despite having contractual obligations for Vale. A court case went to Burslem County Court in November 1886, but the two clubs agreed that Bateman could play for Stoke until the summer of 1887, at which point he would return to Vale. He was a first team regular for the Burslem club from 1887 to 1890, but in the summer of 1890 he returned to Stoke.

He played once for the "Potters" in the Football Alliance in 1890–91 and featured five times in the Football League in 1891–92. He later played for Northwich Victoria. He had scored five goals in 146 games for the Vale, most of which were friendlies.

Career statistics
Source:

Honours
Burslem Port Vale
North Staffordshire Charity Challenge Cup: 1883, 1885 (shared)
Burslem Challenge Cup: 1885

References

People from Wolstanton
English footballers
Association football midfielders
Stoke City F.C. players
Port Vale F.C. players
Northwich Victoria F.C. players
Football Alliance players
English Football League players
1865 births
1953 deaths